Pseudulvella is a genus of green algae, in the family Chaetopeltidaceae.

References

Chlorophyceae genera
Chaetopeltidales